Priority School Building Programme is a United Kingdom government scheme launched in 2014 to address the capital investment needs of schools most in need of urgent repair.

The £4.4 billion Priority School Building Programme (PSBP) is rebuilding and refurbishing school buildings in the worst condition across the country. There are two phases of the programme covering a total of 537 schools. Under the first phase, PSBP1, 260 schools were rebuilt and/or refurbished: 214 through capital grant and 46 using private finance. The first school opened in April 2014 and the vast majority of others opened before the end of 2017.

Under the second phase, PSBP2, focuses on individual blocks rather than whole schools.  277 schools have been or will be rebuilt and refurbished using capital grant, by the end of 2021.

References

External links
Classroom space guidelines

Education in England
Programmes of the Government of the United Kingdom
Governance of England
Procurement